Forgetters is the eponymously titled debut album of the American punk rock band Forgetters. It was released on Too Small to Fail Records, a label founded by the band, on November 13, 2012.

The album cover was painted by Blake Schwarzenbach.

Critical reception
American Songwriter called the album "an intriguing lo-fi mix of [Jets to Brazil’s] pop orientation and [Thorns of Life’s] first-take rawness, with found-sound collages and surprising Gothic overtones."

Track listing
 "Strike" – 3:10
 "Lie Artist" – 3:47
 "I'm Not Immune" – 5:14
 "Turn Away" – 3:47
 "Hoop and Swan" – 4:57
 "Die by Your Own Hand" – 6:29
 "O Deadly Death" – 3:08
 "Les Arrivistes" – 3:49
 "In America" 5:51
 "Seconds" (The Human League cover) – 4:26
 "Ribbonhead" – 6:29

Personnel
Blake Schwarzenbach – vocals, guitar
Kevin Mahon – drums

References

2012 debut albums